The people listed below were born in, residents of, or otherwise closely associated with the city of South Bend, Indiana.

Government and Politics
John Brademas, former House Majority Whip
Pete Buttigieg, Mayor of South Bend (2012–2020) and candidate in the 2020 Democratic Party presidential primaries. First openly gay man to win delegates in a presidential primary and the first openly gay Cabinet member in history. Current Secretary of Transportation.
 Schuyler Colfax, 17th Vice President of the United States
 Alexis Coquillard, founder of South Bend
 Noma Gurich, Chief Justice of the Supreme Court of Oklahoma
 Timothy Howard, 43rd Indiana Supreme Court Chief Justice, Indiana State Senator
 Larry J. McKinney, United States District Court judge
 James Mueller, mayor of South Bend since 2020
 Tim Roemer, former U.S. Ambassador to India and U.S. congressman
 Joe Kernan, politician and Governor of Indiana (2003-2005)
 Clarence Long, U.S. Congressman of Maryland
 Jake Teshka, member of the Indiana House of Representatives

Film and Television
 John Bromfield, actor
 Dick Durock, stuntman and actor
 Chad Everett, actor
 Vivica A. Fox, actress
 Dean Norris, actor
 Michael Warren, actor
 John Clarke, actor
 Lloyd Haynes, actor
 Catherine Hicks, actress; attended Saint Mary's College
 Larry Karaszewski, film and TV screenwriter / producer
 Katie Madonna Lee, screenwriter and filmmaker
 Jeremy Leven, writer, director
 Keith Alan Morris, filmmaker
 Sydney Pollack, film director and actor
 Dan Resin, actor
 George Seaton, film director
  Ansel Wallace, newsreel cameraman and photographer in World War I 
 Daniel Waters, film director and screenwriter
 Mark Waters, film director and producer
 Chuck Zink TV personality
 Charles Butterworth, actor

Sports

American Football
 Anthony Barr, NFL linebacker playing for the Dallas Cowboys
 Frank Bykowski, NFL player
 Bill Doba, football coach
 Kent Gaydos, football player
 Jon Gruden, former ESPN broadcaster and NFL coach
 MyCole Pruitt, NFL tight end for the Atlanta Falcons
 Ernie Zalejski, American football player
 Anthony Johnson (running back), NFL running back

Baseball
 Ollie Bejma, baseball player
 Nancy DeShone, All-American Girls Professional Baseball League (AAGPBL) player for the South Bend Blue Sox
 Dorothea Downs, AAGPBL player, South Bend Blue Sox
 Mary Lou Graham, AAGPBL player, South Bend Blue Sox
 Frances Janssen, AAGPBL player and Northern Indiana Historical Society researcher
 Glenna Sue Kidd, AAGPBL player, South Bend Blue Sox
 Marie Kruckel, AAGPBL player for the South Bend Blue Sox and a 38-year teacher at Clay High School
 Betty Wagoner, AAGPBL player, South Bend Blue Sox
 Janet Wiley, AAGPBL player for the South Bend Blue Sox
 Craig Counsell, baseball player
 Andy Replogle, baseball pitcher

Basketball
 Tom Abernethy, basketball player
 Skylar Diggins, WNBA, American Professional Basketball player
 Jaden Ivey, NBA player for the Detroit Pistons
 Demetrius Jackson, professional basketball player
 Jasmine Watson, women's basketball player
 John Wooden, basketball coach
 John Laskowski, basketball player
 Lee Nailon, NBA basketball player and 2007 Israeli Basketball Premier League MVP
 Blake Wesley, basketball player

Motorsports
 Luther Johnson, Indy car driver
 J. C. McDonald, Indy car driver
 Ryan Newman, NASCAR Cup Series driver
 Mike Salay, Indy car driver
 David Stremme, NASCAR driver
 Mike LaRocco, motocross racer

Miscellaneous
 Mark Hazinski, 2004 USA Olympian in table tennis
 Steve Nemeth, player of gridiron football
 Anne Doyle, sportscaster

Music
 Brendan Bayliss and Jake Cinninger, guitarists, Umphrey's McGee (a progressive rock and jam band from South Bend)
 Tom "Big Daddy" Donahue, pioneering rock and roll radio disc jockey, record producer and concert promoter
 Marcie Free, singer, King Kobra, Unruly Child, Signal
 Josh Garrels, musician
 Nathan Gunn, operatic baritone
 Sneaky Pete Kleinow, musician
 The Rivieras, 1960s garage rock and surf rock band
 Jules C. Stein, music industry executive
 Student Rick, early 2000s pop punk and emo band
 Alexander Toradze, pianist
 Junior Walker, 1960s soul singer and saxophonist signed to Motown (with the All Stars)
 Beatrice Carmichael, opera singer and director
 Ted Leo, musician
 Nathan Gunn, opera singer and professor
 Traci Paige Johnson, co-creator, Blue's Clues TV show
 Merchant Ships, late aughts emo band

Literature
 Elijah Anderson, sociologist and author of Code of the Street
 Phillip Hoose, author
 Kenn Kaufman, naturalist and author
 Bernard Kilgore, journalist, Wall Street Journal
 Dylan Krieger, poet
 Kenneth Rexroth, poet, translator of the classical Chinese poets, essayist, intellectual, anarchist.

Business

Heavy Industries
 James Oliver, inventor and industrialist best known for creating South Bend Iron Works, which was reincorporated as Oliver Farm Equipment Company after his death
 Studebaker Brothers, founders of Studebaker Corporation

Miscellaneous
 Narsai David, San Francisco chef and restaurateur
 Cashmere Nicole, American entrepreneur
 Conrad Prebys, property developer, philanthropist, billionaire

Military
 Jeremy Michael Boorda, Navy admiral
 James H. Kasler, Korean War and Vietnam War fighter pilot and POW; only recipient of three Air Force Crosses
 Joseph A. Nolan Medal of Honor Recipient, Philippine Insurrection
 Howard G. Bunker, Air Force general
 Edward Hale Campbell, Navy admiral

Science
 Debra Elmegreen, astronomer
 Maclyn McCarty, physician and biochemistry researcher who helped identify DNA as the genetic material, ushering in the era of molecular biology
 Robert Fassnacht, researcher killed in bombing
 Marcus Ward Lyon Jr., mammalogist, pathologist

Art
 George Rickey, kinetic sculptor

Education
 Ivan Meštrović, sculptor, professor at the University of Notre Dame, died in South Bend
 Duncan G. Stroik, architect, sacred architecture professor, and founder of Duncan G. Stroik Architect LLC

Others
 Michael Alig, co-founder of the Club Kids and convicted murderer
 Paul Smith, first African American minister at historic First Presbyterian Church of Brooklyn, New York; multicultural consultant, civil rights activist, university administrator, teacher, author
 Emerson Spartz, media mogul
 William Albert Wack, CSC, Bishop of Diocese of Pensacola–Tallahassee

Associated with the University of Notre Dame
 Jacqueline Batteast
 Skylar Diggins
 George Gipp
 Rev. Theodore M. Hesburgh
 Lou Holtz
 Paul Hornung
 Moose Krause
 Frank Leahy
 Johnny Lujack
 Joe Montana
 Ara Parseghian
 Digger Phelps
 Regis Philbin
 Condoleezza Rice
 Knute Rockne
 Daniel "Rudy" Ruettiger
 Joe Theismann
 Charlie Weis
Brian Kelly

References

 
South Bend, Indiana
South Bend